Carlhubbsia is a genus of poeciliids native to Guatemala and Mexico. The name of this genus honours the American ichthyologist Carl Leavitt Hubbs (1894-1979) who originally named the genus Allophallus, a name which was preoccupied by a genus of Diptera.

Species
There are currently two recognized species in this genus:
 Carlhubbsia kidderi (C. L. Hubbs, 1936) (Champoton gambusia)
 Carlhubbsia stuarti D. E. Rosen & R. M. Bailey, 1959 (Barred livebearer)

References

Poeciliidae
Freshwater fish genera
Freshwater fish of Central America
Freshwater fish of Mexico
Fish of Guatemala
Ray-finned fish genera
Taxa named by Gilbert Percy Whitley